Šilalė Lūšis is a professional basketball team, it is based in Šilalė, Lithuania and currently competes in National Basketball League.

Current roster

Club achievements 
 2018-2019 season: RKL 1st place

References 

Šilalė
Šilalė
Basketball teams established in 2008
2008 establishments in Lithuania
National Basketball League (Lithuania) teams